Frank Phillip Sibley (born 4 December 1947, in Uxbridge) is an English former footballer and a member of the QPR double winning side that captured both the Third Division Championship in 1966–67 and the League Cup on 4 March 1967.

Sibley was the youngest player to play in the QPR first team at the age of 15 on 3 September 1963 away to Aldershot in a League Cup tie.

He retired from playing early, at the age of 23, after suffering a knee injury. He joined the coaching staff at QPR, and later became manager. He was also manager of Walsall in 1979.

He is currently chief scout for Watford.

External links

1947 births
Living people
Footballers from Uxbridge
English footballers
Association football defenders
Queens Park Rangers F.C. players
Queens Park Rangers F.C. managers
Walsall F.C. managers
Fulham F.C. non-playing staff
English football managers